Kapchino is a rural locality (a village) in Semizerye Rural Settlement, Kaduysky District, Vologda Oblast, Russia. The population was 28 as of 2002.

Geography 
Kapchino is located 37 km northwest of Kaduy (the district's administrative centre) by road. Uyta is the nearest rural locality.

References 

Rural localities in Kaduysky District